Erin Simms (born December 18, 1976) is a Canadian actress, screenwriter, and producer known for her role in Student Bodies. Since retiring from acting in 2013, Simms has written and produced such films as A Walk in the Woods, Our Souls at Night, and Book Club.

Early life 
Simms was born in Montreal and attended St. George's School of Montreal.

Career 
Simms first acting roles were in the 1995 television film Zoya and in an episode of Are You Afraid of the Dark?. Simms starred in the late-1990s sitcom Student Bodies before leaving the show to become the Yellow Galaxy Power Ranger in Power Rangers Lost Galaxy. After beginning production, Simms was replaced by Cerina Vincent. Simms appeared in several films and television series before 2013. Since then, she has worked as a producer and screenwriter.

Filmography

Film

Television

References 

1976 births
Living people
Canadian film actresses
Canadian television actresses
Film producers from Quebec
Canadian women screenwriters
20th-century Canadian actresses
20th-century Canadian screenwriters
21st-century Canadian actresses
21st-century Canadian screenwriters